Bjerg is a Danish surname meaning mountain. Notable people with this surname include:

 Christian Flindt Bjerg, Danish football player
 Harald Bjerg Emborg (1920–1982), Danish composer
 Johannes Bjerg (1886–1955), Danish sculptor
 Marie Bjerg (born 1988), Danish football player
 Mikkel Bjerg (born 1998), Danish cyclist
 Rasmus Bjerg (born 1976), Danish actor, comedian and singer
 Sanne Bjerg (born 1965), Danish opera librettist, director and novelist
 Søren Bjerg (born 1996), real name of Bjergsen
 Svend Erik Bjerg (born 1944), Danish cyclist
 Tobias Bjerg (born 1998), Danish swimmer

References

Danish-language surnames